The Kyoto Prize in Arts and Philosophy is awarded once a year by the Inamori Foundation for lifetime achievements in the arts and philosophy. The Prize is one of three Kyoto Prize categories; the others are the Kyoto Prize in Advanced Technology and the Kyoto Prize in Basic Sciences. The first Kyoto Prize in Arts and Philosophy was awarded to Olivier Messiaen in 1985, the "greatest composer to have emerged from 20th century France". The Prize is widely regarded as the most prestigious award available in fields not traditionally honored with a Nobel Prize.

Prizes
A Kyoto laureate is awarded a gold medal, a diploma, and a prize money of 100 million yen (US$913,100 or €825,800 as of January 2020), making it one of the richest literary prizes in the world.

Kyoto laureates in Arts and Philosophy
The Kyoto Prize is awarded annually in three categories: Advanced Technology, Basic Sciences, and Arts and Philosophy. The category Arts and Philosophy consists of four fields which are awarded in alternating cycles: Music, Arts, Theater and Cinema, and Thought and Ethics.

Laureates 
Source: Kyoto Prize

Music

Arts

Theater, cinema

Thought and ethics

See also
 Kyoto Prize
 Kyoto Prize in Advanced Technology
 Kyoto Prize in Basic Sciences
 List of Kyoto Prize winners

References

Kyoto Prize
Arts awards
Philosophy awards
International theatre awards
International film awards
International music awards
Kyoto laureates in Arts and Philosophy